Didier Christophe (born 8 December 1956) is a French former professional football player and manager.

External links

External links
 
 
Profile on French federation official site 

1956 births
Living people
Sportspeople from Rhône (department)
French footballers
France international footballers
Association football midfielders
AS Monaco FC players
Lille OSC players
Toulouse FC players
Stade Rennais F.C. players
Stade de Reims players
Grenoble Foot 38 players
Ligue 1 players
Ligue 2 players
French football managers
Pau FC managers
INF Vichy players
Footballers from Auvergne-Rhône-Alpes